Turkey, then the Ottoman Empire, first participated at the Olympic Games in 1908 and has sent athletes to compete in most editions of the Summer Olympic Games since then. Turkey has also participated in most Winter Olympic Games since their first appearance in 1936. Turkish athletes have won a total of 104 medals, divided into 41 golds, 26 silvers and 37 bronzes. Turkey won the most medals in wrestling. The National Olympic Committee for Turkey, Turkish National Olympic Committee was created in 1908 and recognized in 1911.

Medals

Medals by Summer Games

Medals by Winter Games

Medals by Summer Sport

List of Medalist

Athletes with most medals

Change Medalists

 Adem Bereket from 4th place to bronze (Wrestling at the 2000 Summer Olympics – Men's freestyle 76 kg)
 Reyhan Arabacıoğlu from 4th place to bronze (Weightlifting at the 2004 Summer Olympics – Men's 77 kg)

Disqualified Medalists

See also 
 List of flag bearers for Turkey at the Olympics
 :Category:Olympic competitors for Turkey
 Turkey at the Paralympics

External links